Sustipan is a small peninsula located in the southwestern part of Split.  In Middle Ages there was a Benedictine monastery and a church. In the 19th century one of the most beautiful cemeteries of the whole Croatia was built in Sustipan.  The cemetery was removed in the 20th century by the Communist authorities.

Today, there is a beautiful forest park ideal for walking.

Image gallery

References 

Split, Croatia
Peninsulas of Croatia